Following is a list of senators of Alpes-Maritimes, people who have represented the department of Alpes-Maritimes in the Senate of France.

Third Republic

Senators for Alpes-Maritimes under the French Third Republic were:

Fourth Republic

Senators for Alpes-Maritimes under the French Fourth Republic were:

Fifth Republic 
Senators for Alpes-Maritimes under the French Fifth Republic:

References

Sources

 
Lists of members of the Senate (France) by department

Senators of the Alpes-Maritimes department of France.

People from Alpes-Maritimes